Allen R. Miller (1942–2010) was an American mathematician.

Miller was a major contributor to the field of special functions, especially confluent hypergeometric functions.

Biography
A native of Brooklyn, New York, Miller attended George W. Wingate High School and Brooklyn College, where he graduated in 1965 with a degree in mathematics. Miller began his professional career at the Ballistics Research Laboratory at the Aberdeen Proving Ground where he worked with physicist Jane Dewey. In 1967, he moved to the Naval Research Laboratory where he developed high-fidelity mathematical models of interactions between physical systems and electromagnetic fields. Unlike most pure mathematicians of the time, Miller implemented simulations of his models on early supercomputers. In the 1970s Miller was recognized not only as a leading mathematician but also as an expert on the CRAY line of supercomputer.

Miller maintained an academic affiliation with George Washington University as an adjunct professor after retiring from the Naval Research Laboratory in 1991. He published actively until his death from a heart embolism on August 15, 2010.

Special function theory
Miller made numerous contributions in the area of special functions and addressed several significant open problems. Notable among these include his work with Emanuel Vegh in formulating an exact closed-form solution for the grazing angle for specular reflection on a sphere (Alhazen's problem).

Mathematical models
The Miller-Brown-Vegh model (developed at NRL) is commonly used to describe scattering from the ocean surface. It has been adopted in the US Navy's models for propagation over the ocean and appears in the Radar Handbook.

Computer security and information theory
Miller, with Ira S. Moskowitz, made several contributions to the mathematical analysis of covert channels in computer security.  In particular he showed how special functions could simplify the closed form for the Shannon channel capacity and how the difference of divergent series could also be used to express channel capacity in certain physical situations that arise in anonymity networks.

Impact
Allen Miller published around 60 peer-reviewed journal articles and numerous other non-refereed technical reports and articles. His results have been applied in robotics, computer graphics, decision theory, and sensors. Miller received three Alan Berman Research Publication Awards from the Naval Research Laboratory.

References

1943 births
2010 deaths
20th-century American mathematicians
21st-century American mathematicians
Brooklyn College alumni